Hantzsch Island is an uninhabited island in the Qikiqtaaluk Region of Nunavut, Canada. It is located in Frobisher Bay off the southern tip of Baffin Island's Meta Incognita Peninsula and the northeastern tip of Edgell Island. The closest community is the Inuit hamlet of Sanikiluaq,  to the west on Flaherty Island.

Geography
The island is small and dome-shaped. Its habitat is characterized by coastal cliffs, grassy slopes, and a rugged shoreline.

Fauna
Hantzsch Island is a Canadian Important Bird Area (#NU025), an International Biological Program site, and a Key Migratory Terrestrial Bird Site (NU Site 49). Notable bird species include Black-legged Kittiwake, Thick-billed Murre, and Colonial Waterbirds/Seabirds.

Beluga whales, Bearded seal, Ringed seal, Harp seal. Polar bears, and Walrus frequent the area.

History
The island is named in honour of Bernhard Hantzsch, a German ornithologist and Arctic researcher.

References 

Uninhabited islands of Qikiqtaaluk Region
Islands of Frobisher Bay
Important Bird Areas of Qikiqtaaluk Region
Seabird colonies